An electrical drawing is a type of technical drawing that shows information about power, lighting, and communication for an engineering or architectural project. Any electrical working drawing consists of "lines, symbols, dimensions, and notations to accurately convey an engineering's design to the workers, who install the electrical system on the job".

A complete set of working drawings for the average electrical system in large projects usually consists of:
 A plot plan showing the building's location and outside electrical wiring
 Floor plans showing the location of electrical systems on every floor
 Power-riser diagrams showing panel boards.
Single-line diagrams
General arrangement diagrams
 Control wiring diagrams
 Schedules and other information in combination with construction drawings.

Electrical drafters prepare wiring and layout diagrams used by workers who erect, install, and repair electrical equipment and wiring in communication centers, power plants, electrical distribution systems, and buildings.

See also 
 One-line diagram
 Architectural drawing
 Electronic schematic
 Engineering drawing
 Mechanical drawing
 Structural drawing
 Working drawing

References 

Technical drawing
Electrical engineering